Moma Natural Park or Moma Nature Park (Momsky Pryrodny Park; , Aan Aiylgy) is a protected area of the Momsko-Chersk Region of Yakutia in the upper part of the Moma River basin. 

Administratively the park is a part of the Moma District, Sakha Republic, Far Eastern Russia. The nearest city is Khonuu, served by Moma Airport, and the nearest village Sasyr.

Attractions
The park includes part of the mostly mountainous area of the Ulakhan-Chistay Range, featuring pristine ridges and lakes of environmental and aesthetic value. Visitors may find a whole array of educational and recreational purposes in the area. Some of the main features are:

Mount Pobeda, rising in the Buordakh Massif, is the highest point of the Ulakhan-Chistay, as well as of the Chersky mountain system. Climbing routes of varying difficulty are marked —up to category 5A.
Moma River valley, featuring the extinct cinder cone volcanoes Balagan-Tas and Uraga-Tas.
Ulakhan-Taryn (Bolshaya Momskaya Aufeis), a layered ice body formed by frozen river flows. By the end of winter, its dimensions can be 30 km long and 5 km wide with a thickness of 7 meters.
Yuryung Taastah Haya (Marble Mount), a mountain of white stone.

See also
Moma Range, located further north
East Siberian Mountains

References

External links 

Protected areas of the Russian Far East
Tourist attractions in the Sakha Republic
Chersky Range